Rich Oganiru (died 10 August 2021) was a Nigerian actor. He had acted in over 300 films in his career which spanned nearly two decades. 

He held the role of the Corporate Marketing Consultant to the Abuja Chapter of the Actors Guild of Nigeria until his death. He also served as an Evangelist with the Davidical Order Ministry.

Filmography 

 Total Control
 Last Confession
 Wasted Effort
 Pay Day
 His Majesty
 My Destiny
 Lacrima
 Battle of the Rich
 Touching Love
 Queen of Hasso Rock

Controversy 
In September 2012, he was charged over allegations regarding murdering his wife in Abuja.

Death 
He died on 10 August 2021 due to prolonged illness.

References 

2021 deaths
Nigerian film actors